Horsfieldia sparsa is a species of plant in the family Myristicaceae. It is a tree that grows naturally in Sumatra, Peninsular Malaysia, Singapore and Thailand.

References

sparsa
Trees of Sumatra
Trees of Malaya
Trees of Thailand
Near threatened flora of Asia
Taxonomy articles created by Polbot